Christos Tzolis (born 30 January 2002) is a Greek professional footballer who plays as a winger for  club Norwich City and the Greece national team.

Club career

Early career
Tzolis started his first football steps in the academy of his village team, Doxa Pentalofos. He played there from 2006 until 2010, before joining PAOK. In 2015, the then 13-year-old impressed at the Lennart-Johansson-Cup, a tournament for 13 to 14-year-olds. The right-footed winger scored 11 goals in five games and guided his team to the final. Despite losing the final he won the golden boot and was voted the best player of the tournament. In 2018, he returned to PAOK and scored 29 goals in 25 games for the PAOK U17 side, including two goals against Panathinaikos in the championship semi-final.

PAOK
On 20 June 2020, in only his second senior appearance, the 18-year-old displaying excellent technique to net a crucial equaliser. It’s worth noting that Tzolis managed to score 19 goals in just 23 Super League U19 matches this season. Tzolis became the youngest player to score a Super League goal during the 2019–20 season.

On 25 August 2020, Tzolis scored a brace for 2020–21 UEFA Champions League qualifying phase and play-off round against Beşiktaş J.K. Tzolis also added an assist for Dimitris Pelkas. On 11 September 2020, he scored the only goal against AEL in the 2020–21 season opener, named MVP of the game. On 17 September 2020, Tzolis renew his contract with the club until 2024 without a buy out clause. On 5 November 2020, he scored in a 4–1 home win 2020–21 UEFA Europa League group stage game against PSV Eindhoven helping PAOK to increase the possibility of qualifying for the next phase of the UEFA Europa League.

Norwich City
On 12 August 2021, Tzolis left PAOK to join Premier League club Norwich City on a five-year deal for an undisclosed fee. He made an impressive debut for the Canaries on 24 August, as he scored a brace and assisted a further two goals, to help his team seal an emphatic 6–0 win over Bournemouth and progress to the third round of the EFL Cup. He was voted man of the match for his performance.

On 22 July 2022, he joined Twente in the Netherlands on a season-long loan. He returned from his loan spell on 31 January 2023, after a mutual agreement was reached to cut short his loan spell. During his time at Twente, the left winger scored three goals in 15 appearances.

He scored his first goal for Norwich since his return from loan, and his first goal for Norwich in the league, in a 3-1 win against Birmingham City on 21 February 2023.

International career
Tzolis has represented Greece at the under-17 level and under-19 level. At the under-17 level, he appeared in 9 matches and scored 6 goals. On 7 October 2020, Tzolis made his debut for the senior national team in a 2–1 loss to Austria after being substituted on in the 82nd minute for Dimitris Limnios. At the time of his debut, Tzolis became the 7th youngest player in the history of the Greece national team. On 11 November 2020, Tzolis scored his first international goal in a 2–1 victory against Cyprus.

Personal life
His parents, hail from Dropull, Albania

Career statistics

Club

International

Scores and results list Greece's goal tally first, score column indicates score after each Tzolis goal

Honours

Club
PAOK
Greek Cup: 2020–21

Individual
PAOK MVP of the Season: 2020–21
Super League Greece Young Footballer of the Season: 2020–21
Greek Cup top scorer: 2020–21

References

External links

2002 births
Living people
Footballers from Thessaloniki
Greek footballers
Greece youth international footballers
Greece international footballers
Association football forwards
PAOK FC players
Norwich City F.C. players
FC Twente players
Super League Greece players
Premier League players
Greek expatriate footballers
Expatriate footballers in England
Expatriate footballers in Germany
Expatriate footballers in the Netherlands
Greek expatriate sportspeople in England
Greek expatriate sportspeople in Germany
Greek expatriate sportspeople in the Netherlands